American Airlines Flight 191 was a regularly scheduled domestic passenger flight in the United States from O'Hare International Airport in Chicago, Illinois to Los Angeles International Airport in California. All 258 passengers and 13 crew on board were killed, along with two people on the ground. With 273 fatalities, it is the deadliest aviation accident to have occurred in the United States.

The National Transportation Safety Board (NTSB) found that as the aircraft was beginning its takeoff rotation, engine number one (the left engine) separated from the left wing, flipping over the top of the wing and landing on the runway. As the engine separated from the aircraft, it severed hydraulic fluid lines that lock the wing's leading-edge slats in place and damaged a  section of the left wing's leading edge. Aerodynamic forces acting on the wing resulted in an uncommanded retraction of the outboard slats. As the aircraft began to climb, the damaged left wing—with no engine—produced far less lift (it stalled) than the right wing, which had its slats still deployed and its engine providing full takeoff thrust. The disrupted and unbalanced aerodynamics of the aircraft caused it to roll abruptly to the left until it was partially inverted, reaching a bank angle of 112°, before crashing in an open field by a trailer park near the end of the runway. The engine separation was attributed to damage to the pylon structure holding the engine to the wing, caused by improper maintenance procedures used at American Airlines.

Background

Aircraft 

The aircraft involved in the accident was a McDonnell Douglas DC-10-10 registered as N110AA. It had been delivered on February 25, 1972, and at the time of the crash, it had logged just under 20,000 hours of flying time over seven years. The aircraft was powered by three General Electric CF6-6D engines, one on each wing and one on the vertical stabilizer. A review of the aircraft's flight logs and maintenance records showed that no mechanical discrepancies were noted for May 11, 1979. On the day of the accident, in violation of standard procedure, the records were not removed from the aircraft and were destroyed in the accident.

Flight crew
Captain Walter Lux (age 53) had been flying the DC-10 since its introduction eight years earlier. He had logged around 22,000 flying hours, of which about 3,000 were in a DC-10. He was also qualified to pilot 17 other aircraft, including the DC-6, the DC-7, and the Boeing 727. First Officer James Dillard (age 49) and Flight Engineer Alfred Udovich (age 56) were also highly experienced: 9,275 hours and 15,000 hours, respectively. Between them, they had 1,830 hours of flying experience in the DC-10.

Accident

On the accident flight, just as the aircraft reached takeoff speed, the number-one engine and its pylon assembly separated from the left wing, ripping away a  section of the leading edge with it. The combined unit flipped over the top of the wing and landed on the runway. Robert Graham, supervisor of maintenance for American Airlines, stated:

What was said in the cockpit in the 50 seconds leading up to the final impact is not known, as the cockpit voice recorder (CVR) lost power when the engine detached. The only crash-related audio collected by the recorder is a thumping noise (likely the sound of the engine separating), followed by the first officer exclaiming, "Damn!" at which point the recording ends. This may also explain why air traffic control was unsuccessful in their attempts to radio the crew and inform them that they had lost an engine. This loss of power did, however, prove useful in the investigation, serving as a marker of exactly what circuit in the DC-10's extensive electrical system had failed.

In addition to the engine's failure, several related systems failed. The number-one hydraulic system, powered by the number-one engine, also failed but continued to operate through motor pumps that mechanically connected it to hydraulic system three. Hydraulic system three was also damaged and began leaking fluid but maintained pressure and operation until impact. Hydraulic system two was undamaged. The number-one electrical bus, whose generator was attached to the number-one engine, failed, as well, causing several electrical systems to go offline, most notably the captain's instruments, his stick shaker, and the slat disagreement sensors. A switch in the overhead panel would have allowed the captain to restore power to his instruments, but it was not used. The flight engineer might have reached the backup power switch (as part of an abnormal situation checklist—not as part of their takeoff emergency procedure) to restore electrical power to the number-one electrical bus. That would have worked only if electrical faults were no longer present in the number-one electrical system. To reach that backup power switch, the flight engineer would have had to rotate his seat, release his safety belt, and stand up. In any event, the first officer was flying the airplane, and his instruments continued to function normally.

The engine separation severed the hydraulic fluid lines that controlled the leading-edge slats on the left wing and locked them in place, causing the outboard slats (immediately left of the number-one engine) to retract under air load. As a result, the left wing entered a full aerodynamic stall. With the left wing stalled, the aircraft began banking to the left, rolling over onto its side until it was partially inverted at a 112° bank angle (as seen in the Laughlin photograph) with its right wing over its left wing. 

Since the cockpit had been equipped with a closed-circuit television camera positioned behind the captain's shoulder and connected to view screens in the passenger cabin, the passengers may have witnessed these events from the viewpoint of the cockpit as the aircraft dove towards the ground. Whether the camera's view was interrupted by the power loss from the number-one electrical bus is not known. Large sections of aircraft debris were hurled by the force of the impact into an adjacent trailer park, destroying five trailers and several cars. The DC-10 had also crashed into an old aircraft hangar at the edge of the airport at the former site of Ravenswood Airport, which was used for storage.

In addition to the 271 people on board the aircraft, two employees at a nearby repair garage were killed, and two more were severely burned. The crash site is a field located northwest of the intersection of Touhy Avenue (Illinois Route 72) and Mount Prospect Road on the border of the suburbs of Des Plaines and Mount Prospect, Illinois.

Investigation
The disaster and investigation received widespread media coverage. The impact on the public was increased by the dramatic effect of an amateur photo taken of the aircraft rolling that was published on the front page of the Chicago Tribune on the Sunday two days after the crash.

Engine separation

Witnesses to the crash were in universal agreement that the aircraft had not struck any foreign objects on the runway. In addition, no pieces of the wing or other aircraft components were found along with the separated engine, other than its supporting pylon; this would lead investigators to conclude that nothing else had broken free from the airframe and struck the engine. Hence, the engine/pylon assembly separation could only have resulted from a structural failure. The cockpit instrument panels were damaged so badly that they did not provide any useful information.

During the investigation, an examination of the pylon attachment points revealed some damage done to the wing's pylon mounting bracket that matched the bent shape of the pylon's rear attachment fitting. This meant that the pylon attachment fitting had struck the mounting bracket at some point. This was important evidence, as the only way the pylon fitting could strike the wing's mounting bracket in the observed manner was if the bolts that held the pylon to the wing had been removed. The engine/pylon assembly was supported by something other than the aircraft itself. Therefore, investigators could now conclude that the observed damage to the rear pylon mount had been present before the crash occurred rather than being caused by it.

The NTSB determined that the damage to the left-wing engine pylon had occurred during an earlier engine change at the American Airlines aircraft maintenance facility in Tulsa, Oklahoma, between March 29 and 30, 1979. On those dates, the aircraft had undergone routine service, during which the engine and pylon had been removed from the wing for inspection and maintenance. The removal procedure recommended by McDonnell-Douglas called for the engine to be detached from the pylon before detaching the pylon itself from the wing. However, American, as well as Continental Airlines and United Airlines, had developed a different procedure that saved about 200 working hours per aircraft and "more importantly from a safety standpoint, it would reduce the number of disconnects (of systems such as hydraulic and fuel lines, electrical cables, and wiring) from 79 to 27." This new procedure involved the removal of the engine and pylon assembly as a single unit rather than as individual components. United's implementation involved the use of an overhead crane to support the engine/pylon assembly during removal and re-installation. The method chosen by American and Continental relied on supporting the engine/pylon assembly with a large forklift.

If the forklift had been positioned incorrectly, the engine/pylon assembly would not be stable as it was being handled, causing it to rock like a see-saw and jam the pylon against the wing's attachment points. Forklift operators were guided only by hand and voice signals, as they could not directly see the junction between the pylon and the wing. Positioning had to be extremely accurate, or structural damage could result. Compounding the problem, maintenance work on N110AA did not go smoothly. The mechanics started disconnecting the engine and pylon as a single unit, but a shift change occurred halfway through the job. During this interval, even though the forklift remained stationary, the forks supporting the entire weight of the engine and pylon moved downward slightly due to a normal loss of hydraulic pressure associated with the forklift engine being turned off; this caused a misalignment between the engine/pylon and wing. When work was resumed, the pylon was jammed on the wing, and the forklift had to be re-positioned. Whether damage to the mount was caused by the initial downward movement of the engine/pylon structure or by the realignment attempt is unclear. Regardless of how it happened, the resulting damage, although insufficient to cause an immediate failure, eventually developed into fatigue cracking, worsening with each takeoff and landing cycle during the eight weeks that followed. When the attachment finally failed, the engine and its pylon broke away from the wing. The structure surrounding the forward pylon mount also failed from the resulting stresses.

Inspection of the DC-10 fleets of the three airlines revealed that while United's hoist approach seemed harmless, several DC-10s at both American and Continental already had fatigue cracking and bending damage to their pylon mounts caused by similar maintenance procedures. The field service representative from McDonnell-Douglas stated the company would "not encourage this procedure due to the element of risk" and had so advised American Airlines. McDonnell-Douglas, however, "does not have the authority to either approve or disapprove the maintenance procedures of its customers."

Inadequate speed
The NTSB determined that the loss of one engine and the asymmetrical drag caused by damage to the wing's leading edge should not have been enough to cause the pilots to lose control of their aircraft; the aircraft should have been capable of returning to the airport using its remaining two engines. The NTSB thus examined the effects that the engine's separation would have on the aircraft's flight control, hydraulic, electrical, and instrumentation systems. Unlike other aircraft designs, the DC-10 was not equipped with a separate mechanism that would lock the extended leading-edge slats into place, relying instead solely on the hydraulic pressure within the system. The NTSB determined that the engine tore through hydraulic lines as it separated from the DC-10's wing, causing a loss of hydraulic pressure; airflow over the wings forced the left wing slats to retract, which caused a stall over the left wing. In response to the accident, slat relief valves were mandated to prevent slat retraction in case of hydraulic line damage.

The wreckage was too severely fragmented to determine the exact position of the rudders, elevators, flaps, and slats before impact. An examination of eyewitness photographs showed only that the right wing slats were fully extended as the crew tried unsuccessfully to correct their steep roll. The position of the left wing slats could not be determined from the blurry color photographs, so they were sent to a laboratory in Palo Alto, California, for digital analysis, a process that was pushing the limits of 1970s technology and necessitated large, complicated, and expensive equipment. The photographs were reduced to black-and-white, which made distinguishing the slats from the wing itself possible, thus proving that they were retracted. In addition, the aircraft's tail section was verified to be undamaged, and the landing gear was down.

Wind-tunnel and flight-simulator tests were conducted to help understand the aircraft's trajectory after the engine detached and the left wing slats retracted. The DC-10 incorporates two warning devices that might have alerted the pilots to the impending stall: the slat disagreement warning light, which should have illuminated after the uncommanded retraction of the slats, and the stick shaker on the captain's control column, which activates close to the stall speed. Both of these warning devices were powered by an electric generator driven by the number-one engine. Both systems became inoperable after the loss of that engine. The first officer's control column was not equipped with a stick shaker; McDonnell Douglas offered the device as an option for the first officer, but American Airlines chose not to have it installed on its DC-10 fleet. Stick shakers for both pilots became mandatory in response to this accident.

As the aircraft had reached V1, the crew was committed to takeoff, so they followed standard procedures for an engine-out situation. This procedure is to climb at the takeoff safety airspeed (V2) and attitude (angle), as directed by the flight director. The partial electrical power failure, produced by the separation of the left engine, meant that neither the stall warning nor the slat retraction indicator was operative. Therefore, the crew did not know that the slats on the left wing were retracting. This retraction significantly raised the stall speed of the left wing. Thus, flying at the takeoff safety airspeed caused the left wing to stall while the right wing was still producing lift, so the aircraft banked sharply and uncontrollably to the left. Simulator recreations after the accident determined that "had the pilot maintained excess airspeed the accident may not have occurred."

Probable cause
The findings of the investigation by the NTSB were released on December 21, 1979:

Legacy of the DC-10
The crash of Flight 191 brought strong criticism from the media regarding the DC-10's safety and design. The DC-10 had been involved in two accidents related to the design of its cargo doors, American Airlines Flight 96 (1972) and Turkish Airlines Flight 981 (1974). The separation of engine one from its mount, the widespread publication of the dramatic images of the airplane missing its engine seconds before the crash, and a second photo of the fireball resulting from the impact, raised widespread concerns about the safety of the DC-10. The final blow to the airplane's reputation was dealt two weeks after the crash when the Federal Aviation Administration (FAA) grounded the aircraft. Although the aircraft itself was later exonerated, the damage in the public's eye was already done.

The investigation also revealed other DC-10s with damage caused by the same faulty maintenance procedure. The faulty procedure was banned, and the aircraft type went on to have a long career as a passenger and cargo aircraft. In response to this accident, American Airlines was fined $500,000 (equivalent to $ million in  dollars) by the U.S. government for improper maintenance procedures. Earl Russell Marshall, chief of the crew of American Airlines maintenance facility in Tulsa who supervised the last maintenance procedure on the aircraft, subsequently committed suicide the night before he was to be deposed by McDonnell Douglas attorneys.

On June 6, 1979, two weeks after the crash, the FAA suspended the type certificate for the DC-10, thereby grounding all DC-10s under its jurisdiction. It also enacted a special air regulation banning the DC-10 from U.S. airspace, which prevented foreign DC-10s not under the jurisdiction of the FAA from flying within the country. This was done while the FAA investigated whether the airplane's engine mounting and pylon design met relevant requirements. Once the FAA was satisfied that maintenance issues were primarily at fault and not the actual design of the aircraft, the type certificate was restored on July 13, and the special air regulation was repealed. The type certificate was amended, however, stating, "...removal of the engine and pylon as a unit will immediately render the aircraft unairworthy."

In the wake of the grounding, the FAA convened a safety panel under the auspices of the National Academy of Sciences to evaluate the design of the DC-10 and the U.S. regulatory system in general. The panel's report, published in June 1980, found "critical deficiencies in the way the government certifies the safety of American-built airliners", focusing on a shortage of FAA expertise during the certification process and a corresponding overreliance on McDonnell Douglas to ensure that the design was safe. Writing for The Air Current, aviation journalist Jon Ostrower likens the panel's conclusions to those of a later commission convened after the 2019 grounding of the Boeing 737 MAX. Ostrower faults both manufacturers for focusing on the letter of the law regarding regulatory standards, taking a design approach that addresses how the pilots could address single-system failures without adequately considering scenarios in which multiple simultaneous malfunctions of different systems could occur.

On October 31, 1979, a DC-10 flying as Western Airlines Flight 2605 crashed in Mexico City after a red-eye flight from Los Angeles. The Western crash, however, was due to low visibility and an attempt to land on a closed runway, through, reportedly, confusion of its crew.

The loss of Air New Zealand Flight 901 on November 28, 1979, which killed 257 people, added to the DC-10's negative reputation. The Antarctic sightseeing flight hit a mountain; however, the crash was caused by several human and environmental factors not related to the airworthiness of the DC-10, and the aircraft was later completely exonerated.

Ironically, another DC-10 crash ten years later, United Airlines Flight 232, restored some of the aircraft's reputation. Despite the aircraft losing an engine and all flight controls and crash-landing in a huge fireball (which was caught on video by a local news crew) that killed 112 people, 184 people survived the accident. Experts praised the DC-10's sturdy construction as partly responsible for the high number of survivors.

Orders for DC-10s dropped off sharply after the events of 1979 (the U.S. economic recession of 1979–82 was also a contributing factor in reduced demand for airliners). From there until the end of production ten years later, the two largest DC-10 customers were FedEx and the U.S. Air Force (KC-10 Extender). Despite initial safety concerns, DC-10 aircraft continued to serve with passenger airlines for over three decades after the crash of Flight 191. DC-10 production ended in 1988, and many retired passenger DC-10s have since been converted to all-cargo use. The DC-10 freighter, along with its derivative, the MD-11, constitute part of the FedEx Express fleet. The DC-10s have been upgraded with the glass cockpit from the MD-11, thereby turning them into MD-10s. American Airlines retired its last DC-10s in 2000 after 29 years of service. In February 2014, Biman Bangladesh Airlines operated the final DC-10 passenger flights. DC-10s continue to be used extensively in air freight operations, and military variants also remain in service.

Victims

Nationalities of the victims

Passengers
Two of the victims in the crash of Flight 191 were:
 Itzhak Bentov, a Czechoslovakia-born Israeli–American biomedical inventor (the cardiac catheter) and New Age author (Stalking the Wild Pendulum and A Cosmic Book)
 Leonard Stogel, music business manager/promoter/producer/executive for California Jam, California Jam II, Sweathog, The Cowsills, Sam the Sham, Tommy James and the Shondells, Redbone, Gentle Giant, and other musical groups: Stogel's parents had earlier perished on American Airlines Flight 1.

Memorial
For 32 years, the victims had no permanent memorial. Funding was obtained for a memorial in 2009 through a two-year effort by the sixth-grade class of Decatur Classical School in Chicago. The memorial, a  concave wall with interlocking bricks displaying the names of the crash victims, was formally dedicated in a ceremony on October 15, 2011. The memorial is located on the south shore of Lake Opeka, at Lake Park at the northwest corner of Lee and Touhy Avenues, two miles east of the crash site. A remembrance ceremony was held at the memorial on May 25, 2019, the 40th anniversary of the accident.

30 victims whose remains were never identified are buried at Green Hills Memorial Park in Rancho Palos Verdes, California.

Depictions in media
The cable/satellite National Geographic channel produced a documentary on the crash, and an episode from Seconds From Disaster titled "Chicago Plane Crash" detailed the crash and included film of the investigation press conferences. The Canadian television series Mayday profiled the crash in the episode "Catastrophe at O'Hare", which subsequently aired in the U.S. on the Smithsonian Channel and National Geographic Channel's television series Air Disasters.

Chicago folk singer Steve Goodman wrote the song "Ballad of Flight 191 (They Know Everything About It)" in response to the crash and the subsequent investigation as the inaugural song for a series of topical songs that aired on National Public Radio in 1979.

See also
 List of disasters in the United States by death toll
 List of aircraft accidents and incidents by number of ground fatalities
 Aviation accidents and incidents
 Aviation safety
 Similar accidents caused by engine separation
 China Airlines Flight 358
 El Al Flight 1862
Japan Air Lines Cargo Flight 46E
Trans-Air Service Flight 671
Reeve Aleutian Airways Flight 8
 Flight 191 - a list of other flights with the same or similar number

References

Further reading

External links 

 Memorial in Lake Park, Des Plaines
 NTSB Accident Report
 Alternate link
"Public Lessons Learned from Accidents – American Airlines Flight 191" (Archive)
 PlaneCrashInfo.Com – American Airlines Flight 191
Flight 191 Remembered (Fox Chicago website) (Archive)
 Pre-crash pictures from Airliners.net
NTSB Probable Cause Report (Alternate, Archive)
 News reports  at The Museum of Classic Chicago Television

History of Chicago
Airliner accidents and incidents in Illinois
Airliner accidents and incidents caused by in-flight structural failure
Aviation accidents and incidents in the United States in 1979
1970s in Chicago
1979 in Illinois
Airliner accidents and incidents caused by maintenance errors
191
Disasters in Illinois
Accidents and incidents involving the McDonnell Douglas DC-10
O'Hare International Airport
May 1979 events in the United States
Airliner accidents and incidents involving in-flight engine separations
Aviation accidents and incidents caused by loss of control